Fankhauser is a surname. Notable people with the surname include:

Clemens Fankhauser (born 1985), Austrian cyclist
Gerhard Fankhauser (1901–1981), American  embryologist
James Fankhauser (born 1939), American conductor, tenor and educator
Merrell Fankhauser (born 1943), American singer, songwriter and guitarist
Peter Fankhauser (born 1960), Swiss businessman, chief executive officer of the Thomas Cook Group
Philipp Fankhauser (born 1964), Swiss blues musician and songwriter
Rupert Fankhauser, Austrian clarinetist
Urs Fankhauser (1943–2018), Swiss rower

See also 
Fankhauser Reserve, is a multi-sports venue in Southport, a suburb in the Gold Coast, Australia